Sweet Dynamite is the debut album by Canadian singer Claudja Barry.

Track listing
"Sweet Dynamite"	4:06	
"Why Must a Girl Like Me"	4:07	
"Dance, Dance, Dance"	5:34	
"Live a Little Bit"	3:51	
"This Taste of Love"	4:26	
"Love for the Sake of Love"	5:16	
"Ride On My Fire"	4:07	
"Do It Again"	8:28	
"Nobody Loves Me Like You Do Do"	2:56

Charts

Singles

References

External links
 Claudja Barry-Sweet Dynamite at Discogs

1976 debut albums
Claudja Barry albums
Philips Records albums